Ekuvukeni is a town in Uthukela District Municipality in the KwaZulu-Natal province of South Africa that was established in 1972.

References

Populated places in the Alfred Duma Local Municipality